The Lars and Christina Olsen House is a historic residence in southeastern Orem, Utah, United States, that is listed on the National Register of Historic Places (NRHP).

Description
The hosese is located at 417 South 800 East and was built in 1885 by Lars Olsen. Son Otto reportedly trained boxer great Jack Dempsey at this house.

It was listed on the NRHP June 11, 1998.

See also

 National Register of Historic Places listings in Utah County, Utah

References

External links

Neoclassical architecture in Utah
Houses completed in 1885
Houses in Orem, Utah
Houses on the National Register of Historic Places in Utah
National Register of Historic Places in Orem, Utah